Mueang Samut Prakan district or colloquially as Paknam Samut Prakan is the capital district (amphoe mueang) of Samut Prakan province in central Thailand. The district has the highest population of all districts of Thailand.

Administration

Central administration 
Mueang Samut Prakan is divided into 13 subdistricts (tambon), which are further subdivided into 35 administrative villages (muban).

Missing numbers are tambons split off at the creation of Phra Samut Chedi district.

Local administration 
There is one city (thesaban nakhon) in the district:
 Samut Prakan consisting of subdistrict Pak Nam.

There are two towns (thesaban mueang) in the district:
 Pak Nam Samut Prakan consisting of parts of subdistrict Bang Mueang.
 Phraek Sa Mai consisting of parts of subdistrict Phraek Sa Mai.

There are five subdistrict municipalities (thesaban tambon) in the district:
 Samrong Nuea consisting of parts of subdistricts Samrong Nuea, Bang Mueang Mai, Thepharak.
 Dan Samrong consisting of parts of subdistrict Samrong Nuea.
 Bang Mueang consisting of parts of subdistricts Bang Mueang, Bang Mueang Mai, Thepharak.
 Phraek Sa consisting of parts of subdistricts Phraek Sa, Thepharak, Phraek Sa Mai.
 Bang Pu consisting of subdistricts Thai Ban, Bang Pu Mai, Bang Pu, Thai Ban Mai.

There are four subdistrict administrative organizations (SAO) in the district:
 Phraek Sa consisting of parts of subdistrict Phraek Sa.
 Bang Prong consisting of subdistrict Bang Prong.
 Bang Duan consisting of subdistrict Bang Duan.
 Thepharak consisting of parts of subdistrict Thepharak.

Economy
Interhides Public Company (IHL) operates nine tanning factories in Bang Pu Mai and is building a tenth factory there to be operational by 2020. IHL produce finished leathers for international footwear, automotive, and furniture companies.

Environment
The district's coastline has seen severe erosion since the 1990s. Coastal mangrove forests were destroyed and replaced with shrimp farms. Three to five metres of shoreline has been submerged every year since then, resulting in the loss of 4,000 rai of land to the sea.

Thailand lost almost one third of its coastal mangrove forests between 1961 and 2000.  According to Thailand's Department of Marine and Coastal Resources, a quarter of the country's shores—about 700 kilometres (500 miles)—are eroding, some "severely".

Education
The Thai Sikh International School is in Samrong, in the district.

Health 
Samut Prakan Hospital, the main hospital of the province is located in the district.

References

External links

 Amphoe.com 

Mueang Samut Prakan